Geovana De Cassia Peres (born 8 February 1977) is a Brazilian born New Zealand professional muay thai fighter and former professional boxer who competed from 2017 to 2019. She became the first female light-heavyweight world champion, having held the WBO female title from 2019 until her retirement in January 2021.

Corporate and amateur boxing
When she was 38 years old, Geovana Peres began her boxing career at a corporate level, where she took on Teuila Laika on a charity fundraiser event for Canteen New Zealand. This was Teuila Laika third corporate boxing fight which gave her experience. Geovana won her first bout by unanimous decision, winning every round. Peres went on to win Golden Gloves title and another win in the corporate division before turning pro.

Professional boxing career
In March 2017, Geovana Peres made her professional debut against veteran kickboxer Sarah Long. Long who had five wins and four losses in kick boxing, didn't start off very well in professional boxing. Long was defeated by Nailini Helu and Cheyenne Whaanga, both who were once top 10 boxers. Sarah Long made a come back by defeating Tash Pakai. It was a close fight between Geovana Peres and Sarah Long, however Long experience gave her the advantage helping her take home the win by Unanimous decision. Long went on to reaching top 10 in the world then challenger for the NZPBA Heavyweight title, but for Geovana Peres it was back to the drawing board.

In March 2017, it was announced that Geovana Peres will take on former top 10 in the world boxing Nailini Helu for the vacant NZNBF New Zealand light heavyweight title. Helu climbed the ranks quickly in 2016, reaching 8th in the heavyweight world. But after a decision that was reversed to a draw in September 2016 and receiving a massive backlash from boxing fans, Helu went down hill. Nailini Helu went up against Alrie Meleisea twice but lost by split decision. Helu received another New Zealand title chance but this time against Geovana Peres. Peres was coming off a professional loss herself, so she had to come back with something to prove. Geovana Peres won the bout by Unanimous decision, winning 7 out of 8 rounds of the fight. This made her the first person that is Brazilian and first LGBT person to win a New Zealand Professional boxing title.

In July 2017, Geovana Peres took on Tessa Tualevao. Tualevao at the time was only 18, however despite her very young age she had a big kickboxing experience. Geovana came in as a keep busy fight and showed her experience and skill against Tessa. Peres was too much for Tualevao as Peres knocked her down in the second round. Peres won the bout by Unanimous Decision.

After her warm up fight, it was announced that Geovana Peres will be going for her second New Zealand title, taking on Trish Vaka for the PBCNZ New Zealand light heavyweight title. Peres admitted that she didn't know much about Trish Vaka, as there wasn't much video material online to watch her at the time. Peres stated that she was very focused for this fight and wanted this title. The fight was a close fight, however Geovana Peres came away with the victory and not only winning another New Zealand title, but becoming first women to win two different New Zealand titles.

In December 2017, Geovana Peres took on Tessa Tualevao in a rematch. Peres underestimated Tualevao in the first round which gave Tessa winning the round. The second round was close however Geovana proceeded to win the rest of the bout. Peres won the bout by Unanimous Decision. After the bout, in an interview with Benjamin Thomas Watt she stated "I always feel great after a win, but you know you can't underestimate you opponent and Tessa is very talented and tough girl".

In March 2018, Geovana Peres defended her PBCNZ New Zealand title against Lani Daniels in their first 10-round fight. Lani Daniel's is well known for being a multiple New Zealand Amateur champion. She has a big amateur boxing background alongside her sister Caroline Daniels. The bout against was extremely close and Peres almost was knocked down in the ninth round. Peres won the bout by a very close Split Decision. After the bout, manager of Lani Daniel's stated they are wanting to have a rematch with Peres as soon as possible.

After Peres bout against Daniels, an announcement was made that big talks were in progress for a future world title bout. The plan was stated that Lani Daniels will take on Nailini Helu sometime in July or August. The winner of that bout will take on Geovana Peres in February 2019 for some sort of regional title in one of the major 4 sanctioning bodies. The winner between Geovana Peres and Lani Daniels or Nailini Helu will take on Alrie Meleisea for a World title. That world title bout will either take place late in 2019 or early 2020. After the announcement of future world title plans, Geovana Peres received her first World ranking from a major boxing sanctioning body. It was announced in early April 2018, that Peres is ranked 5th in the World Boxing Association Heavyweight female rankings. In July 2018, Lani Daniels defeated Nailini Helu by Unanimous decision. Lani then defeated Tessa Tualevao in September 2018. In mid 2018, Geovana rankings jumped to 1st in WBA and 2nd on Boxrec. Lani Daniels was also ranked 10th in the WBA and 8th on Boxrec. In an interview on Gladrap Channel on YouTube, Benjamin Thomas Watt who helps promoter Peres, announced that her manager is in the middle of negotiations for a World title fight. Peres was scheduled to fight Nailini Helu on 6 December 2018, however due to failing police permit, Helu was not able to fight and trish Vaka stepped in on 3 days notice. Geovana won the fight by Unanimous decision, winning every round and dominating the fight.

WBO light heavyweight title

On 17 December 2018, it was announced that Peres will be going against Lani Daniels in a rematch for the WBO World Light Heavyweight title. The event took place on 30 March 2018 in Auckland New Zealand. Geovana Peres won the inuguarl WBO world title by unanimous decision in front of a sold-out crowd. Shortly after the fight, Geovana Peres signed a three-fight deal with Rival Sports Promotion NZ, which is managed by Bruce Glozier and Steve Deane.

On 30 July 2019, Geovana Peres promoter, Bruce Glozier, announced that Peres will defend her WBO World Women's light heavyweight title against Claire Hafner at Sky City Convention Centre in Auckland, New Zealand on 4 October 2019. Peres started promoting the fight by doing boxing training pad works on the Sky walk 193 metres off the ground on the Sky Tower. Peres won the bout by Referee stoppage between the 8th and the 9th round. 

On 26 January 2021, it was announced that Geovana Peres had officially retired from boxing, ending her career as a world champion.

Kickboxing and Muay Thai Career
On the 16 April 2021, Geovana Peres made her amateur muay thai fight debut against IFMA Junior Gold Medalist and GAMMA World Champion Roezala Su’e. On the 13th of August, Peres won her first kickboxing fight against Gina Gee. Peres won the fight by unanimous decision with her winning the inaugural Fau Vake Warrior's Heart Memorial Shield. On the 12th of October 2022, it was announced that Peres would competed in her third muay thai fight on the 5th of November against former MMA New Zealand star Faith McMah. This fight will be for the WMC New Zealand heavyweight title. Peres won the fight by a close split decision.

Combat sport titles

Amateur boxing titles
 2016 New Zealand North Island Golden Gloves Gold medallist 
 Defeated Ruby Tefuga 3–0

Professional boxing titles
 New Zealand National Boxing Federation
 New Zealand National Light Heavyweight Title 
 Professional Boxing Commission New Zealand
 New Zealand National Light Heavyweight Title (174¾ Ibs)

Kickboxing and Muay Thai titles
 World Muay Thai Council (WMC)
 New Zealand Heavyweight Title

Fight record

Professional boxing record

Kickboxing and Muay Thai record

Research
In 2012, Geovana Peres was credited for contributing to research at Auckland University at their Liggins Institute. The research was about pregnant  obese women exercising during pregnancy and the effects on the offspring and their own health. Peres was the assistant physiologist for the research. The Research article was released in 2014.

Personal life
In July 2018, Geovana Peres became a New Zealand citizen.

Awards and recognitions
2018 New Zealand LGBTI Awards Sports Personality of the Year (Nominated)
2019 Gladrap Boxing Awards Best looking female boxer of the year (Nominated)
2019 Gladrap Boxing Awards Champion of the year (Won)
2019 Gladrap Boxing Awards Knockout of the year (Nominated)
2019 Gladrap Boxing Awards International fight of the year (Nominated)
2019 Gladrap Boxing Awards New Zealand Fight of the year (Won)
2019 Gladrap Boxing Awards Female Boxer of the Year (Won)
2019 Gladrap Boxing Awards Boxer of the Year (Won)
2021 Fau Vake Warrior's Heart Memorial Shield (Won)

References

1977 births
Living people
Boxers from Auckland
New Zealand women boxers
New Zealand people of Brazilian descent
Heavyweight boxers
New Zealand professional boxing champions
Lesbian sportswomen
Brazilian women boxers
New Zealand world boxing champions
New Zealand LGBT sportspeople
LGBT boxers
Brazilian LGBT sportspeople